Prismatine is an orthorhombic-dipyramidal mineral containing aluminium, boron, fluorine, hydrogen, iron, magnesium, oxygen, and silicon. It forms a solid solution series with kornerupine.

References 

Sorosilicates
Orthorhombic minerals
Minerals in space group 63